Revue du Lyonnais was a French scholarship review based in Lyon, established by Léon Boitel and published from 1835 to 1924. It was subtitled, recueil historique et littéraire. In 1852, Léon Boitel sold his printing press to Aimé Vingtrinier (1812-1903) who continued the publication of the review until 1880.

References

1835 establishments in France
1924 disestablishments in France
Defunct literary magazines published in France
French-language magazines
History magazines
Magazines established in 1835
Magazines disestablished in 1924
Mass media in Lyon